Russell-Heath House is a historic home located near Stoneboro, Kershaw County, South Carolina. It was built about 1830, and renovated about 1906.  The main block  is a two-story, rectangular structure with a lateral gable roof and a one-story, gable-roof wing. It has clapboard siding and a brick pier foundation. The façade has a projecting Classical Revival portico with four granite pillars. Also on the property are two contributing early-20th century, vertical plank sheds.

It was listed on the National Register of Historic Places in 1990.

References 

Houses on the National Register of Historic Places in South Carolina
Neoclassical architecture in South Carolina
Houses completed in 1830
Houses in Kershaw County, South Carolina
National Register of Historic Places in Kershaw County, South Carolina
1830 establishments in South Carolina